Jallab ( / ALA-LC: jallāb) is a type of fruit syrup popular in the Middle East made from carob, dates, grape molasses and rose water.
Jallab is very popular in Palestine, Syria, Jordan, Lebanon and Egypt. It is made mainly of grape molasses, grenadine syrup, and rose water, then smoked with Arabic incense. It is usually sold with crushed ice and floating pine nuts and raisins.

See also

 Levantine cuisine
 List of grape dishes
 List of smoked foods
 Grape syrup

References

External links

Levantine cuisine
Levantine drinks
Fruit juice
Grape dishes
Iraqi cuisine
Jordanian cuisine
Lebanese cuisine
Non-alcoholic drinks
Palestinian cuisine
Syrian cuisine
Smoked food
Syrup